The 2017 NASCAR Whelen Euro Series is the ninth Racecar Euro Series season, and the fifth under the NASCAR Whelen Euro Series branding. Anthony Kumpen enters the season as the defending champion in the Elite 1 class. Stienes Longin entered the season as the defending Elite 2 champion, but he will not defend his title as he moved up to the Elite 1 class.

In the Elite 1 class, Alon Day won his first Elite 1 title, winning the championship by 53 points over Anthony Kumpen. In the Elite 2 class, Thomas Ferrando won his first Elite 2 title, finishing ahead of PK Carsport's Guillaume Dumarey by 91 points. Knauf Racing, represented by the No. 37 team, won their first (and only) team's championship title.

The season also included one non-championship event, the Trofeo Angelo Caffi, which was held at a temporary track that were laid down for the 2017 Bologna Motor Show and was won by Lorenzo Marcucci.

Teams and drivers

Elite 1 Division

Elite 2 Division

Elite Club Division

Team changes
 PK Carsports's Elite 1 driver Bert Longin left the series after three seasons to focus on his European Le Mans Series and Belcar campaigns. His seat was filled by his son Stienes who won the Elite 2 championship in 2016. In the Elite 2 class, Guillaume Dumarey joines the series.
 Brass Racing was forced to make a name change. As the name was EU registered by another company, the racing team is now called "Braxx Racing" for 2017.
 German endurance racing team Mishumotors made their NASCAR Euro Series debut in 2017.

Notes

Schedule and results

Calendar changes
Raceway Venray announced its date on October 25, switching from the Pinkster weekend (June 2 through 4th in 2017) to an entirely new date on 15th and 16 July, held in conjunction with the LMV8 Eurocup.
Tours Speedway will not return to the schedule for 2017 after being a staple of the series for five consecutive seasons and the first oval the series visited.
 The series returns to Germany during the last weekend of July using the National Circuit at the Hockenheimring.
 Franciacorta has replaced Adria as the host for the Semi-Finals.

Elite 1

Elite 2

Standings

Elite 1
(key) Bold - Pole position awarded by fastest qualifying time (in Race 1) or by previous race's fastest lap (in Race 2). Italics - Fastest lap. * – Most laps led.

See also

2017 Monster Energy NASCAR Cup Series
2017 NASCAR Xfinity Series
2017 NASCAR Camping World Truck Series
2017 NASCAR K&N Pro Series East
2017 NASCAR K&N Pro Series West
2017 NASCAR Whelen Modified Tour
2017 NASCAR Pinty's Series
2017 NASCAR PEAK Mexico Series

References

External links
 

NASCAR Whelen Euro Series seasons
NASCAR Whelen Euro Series